Dagmar Dolby (1941/1942) is an American philanthropist billionaire worth $5.5 billion as of December 2021. The source of her wealth comes from Dolby Laboratories, founded by her late husband Ray Dolby.

Early life and education 
Dolby was born in Germany in 1941 as Dagmar Bäumert. She grew up in Frankfurt, Germany.

She met her future husband Ray Dolby in 1962 while she was living in Cambridge, England, and he was a Marshall Scholar at Cambridge University studying physics. The pair traveled to India, where Ray served as an advisor to the United Nations for two years before they returned to Great Britain by car. In 1965 in London, Ray founded Dolby Laboratories, which would go on to pioneer noise reduction and surround sound technology and serve as the source of the Dolby family's wealth.

Dagmar and Ray married in 1966.

Philanthropy 
In 1976, Dagmar Dolby and her family moved to San Francisco, California, the new headquarters of her husband's company, Dolby Laboratories. She became a fixture of the city's social scene and focused on philanthropy.

Ray Dolby was diagnosed with Alzheimer's disease around 2009, which precipitated Dagmar's involvement in Alzheimer's research and advocacy. The Dolby family donated $21 million to the California Pacific Medical Center in 2011, though the donation wasn't announced until 2014. They also gave $16 million in 2006 and $20 million in 2011 to build the Ray and Dagmar Dolby Regeneration Medicine Building for stem cell research at the University of California-San Francisco.

When Ray Dolby died of leukemia in 2013, and Dagmar assumed ownership of nearly half of Dolby Laboratories.

She donated $52.6 million to Cambridge University in 2015 to fund construction of the Ray and Dagmar Dolby Court, a student living area. In 2017, Dagmar became a signatory of The Giving Pledge, with a focus on reproductive rights, stem cell research, and research on mood disorders and Alzheimer's disease.

Personal life 
She lives in the Pacific Heights neighborhood of San Francisco, and has four granddaughters.

References

1940s births
American billionaires
Female billionaires
Living people
American women philanthropists
American socialites
California Democrats
German American